Pendragon: Sword of His Father is a 2008 Christian historical fiction film based on the Arthurian legend directed by Chad Burns. It was filmed in five U.S. states, and was released on November 25, 2008. The film won "Best Family Picture" and two other awards at the 2009 Bare Bones International Film Festival, and will also be featured at the SENE Film, Music & Arts Festival.

Plot 
The story is set in 411 AD, one year after the legions of Rome withdrew from the Isle of Britannia. Pendragon is the story of young Artos who is raised to believe that God has a purpose for his life. After a tragic event resulting in the burning of his village, the death of his father, and the disappearance of his little sister Adria, he is taken into slavery by the Saxons, where Artos begins to question his God. He soon manages to escape from the Saxons and is nursed back to health by a Roman outcast named Lailoken. When he fully recovers, Artos travels to a Celtic fortress hidden in the Welsh mountains where he becomes a great warrior under King Ambrosius. Advancing through the military ranks, Artos begins to understand that his father's vision was not based on the strength of man, but on the plan of God. However, his success causes one of Ambrosius's men, his pagan Captain of the Guard Caydern, to become jealous of Artos's rapid rise to power in the military. Using a secret guard that he created several years ago, Caydern is able to murder Ambrosius, and to frame the assassination on Artos. While on trial, Artos escapes from the court, and is able to elude Caydern's elite guard. Further events force Artos to decide between following God's plan unto certain death or abandoning God to save himself.

Cast 
 Aaron Burns as Artos Pendragon
 Nick Burns as Caydern - Ambrosius' pagan captain of the guard, ruthless and jealous of Artos' rise in rank and favor
 Marilyn Burns as Wenneveria - The beautiful daughter of Ambrosius
 Erik Dewar as Brotus
 Andy Burns as Ambrosius
 Chad Burns as Lailoken
 Raymond Burns as Justinian Pendragon - Father of Artos and a garrison commander in the east of Britannia; killed during the initial Saxon invasion.
 Rebekah Wixom as Adria - Artos' sister

References

External links 
 
 
 Pendragon: Sword of His Father review at The Dove Foundation

Films about evangelicalism
2008 films
2008 fantasy films
Fiction set in Roman Britain
Films set in the 5th century
Arthurian films
2000s English-language films
American fantasy films
American adventure films
2000s American films